Layton or The Laytons may refer to:

Places

United States
 Layton, Florida, a city
 Layton, Indiana, an unincorporated community
 Layton Township, Pottawattamie County, Iowa
 Layton, New Jersey, an unincorporated community
 Layton, Pennsylvania, an unincorporated community
 Layton, Utah, a city

England
 Layton, Blackpool, a district of the town of Blackpool, Lancashire, England

American schools
 Layton High School, Layton, Utah
 Layton School of Art, a former post-secondary school in Milwaukee, Wisconsin
 Layton Preparatory School, a private preparatory school in Centreville, Delaware

Transportation
 Layton railway station (England), Layton, Lancashire
 Layton station (FrontRunner), a commuter rail station in Layton, Utah
 Layton Bridge, a road bridge (formerly a railroad bridge) in Pennsylvania, United States, on the National Register of Historic Places

People
 Layton (surname)
 Layton (given name)

Other uses
 Baron Layton, a title in the Peerage of the United Kingdom
 Professor Hershel Layton, title character of the Professor Layton series of video games
 The Laytons, a 1948 American sitcom

See also 

 Layton House, Laytonsville, Maryland, United States, on the National Register of Historic Places
 Lord Layton (disambiguation)
 
 Leighton (disambiguation) (may be pronounced 'lay-ton' or 'lie-ton')
 Leyton (disambiguation)
 Lawton (disambiguation)